Benjamin James Ackland (born 26 October 1989) is an English-born Irish cricketer. He is a right-handed batsman who bowls right-arm off break. He was born in Nuneaton in Warwickshire, and educated at Queen's College, Taunton.

Ackland made his debut for Ireland Under-19s in a Youth One Day International against England Under-19s in the 2008 Under-19 World Cup.  He made six appearances in that competition and also played for Ireland Under-19s in 2010 Under-19 World Cup, making five appearances in that competition.

Later in 2010, while studying for his degree in Sports Science & Coaching at Anglia Ruskin University, Ackland made his first-class debut for Cambridge MCCU against Leicestershire. He made a further appearance that season against Sussex.  In the 2011 season, he made three further first-class appearances for the team, playing against Essex, Middlesex and Surrey.  In his five first-class matches to date, he has scored 293 runs at an average of 41.85, with a high score of 74.  This score, one of four fifties he made, came against Middlesex.

References

External links

1989 births
Living people
Sportspeople from Nuneaton
English emigrants to Ireland
People educated at Queen's College, Taunton
Alumni of Anglia Ruskin University
Irish cricketers
Cambridge MCCU cricketers